Gabriela Radice (born 1968) is an Argentine journalist.

Awards

Nominations
 2013 Martín Fierro Awards
 Best female journalist

References

Argentine women journalists
People from Buenos Aires
Living people
1968 births